Pase or PASE may refer to:

 Pasé language, an extinct Arawakan language
 Prosopography of Anglo-Saxon England
 Portable Applications Solutions Environment
 Dunaújváros PASE, a Hungarian football club

See also 
 Passe (disambiguation)